The Ankaizina mine is a large mine in the southern part of Madagascar in Atsimo-Atsinanana. Ankaizina is one of the largest bauxite reserves in Madagascar or all of Asia, having estimated reserves of  grading 40.7% aluminium oxide.

See also 
 Mining industry of Madagascar

References 

Bauxite mines in Madagascar